Golemani Peak is the peak rising to 2976 m in the Bangey Heights of north-central Sentinel Range in Ellsworth Mountains, Antarctica.  It surmounts Patleyna Glacier to the southwest, Marsa Glacier to the north and Padala Glacier to the east.

The peak is named after the settlements of Golemani and Golemanite in Northern Bulgaria.

See also
 Mountains in Antarctica

Location
US mapping in 1961, updated in 1988.

Maps
 Vinson Massif.  Scale 1:250 000 topographic map. Reston, Virginia: US Geological Survey, 1988.

Notes

References
 Golemani Peak. SCAR Composite Antarctic Gazetteer.
 Bulgarian Antarctic Gazetteer. Antarctic Place-names Commission. (details in Bulgarian, basic data in English)

External links
 Golemani Peak. Copernix satellite image

Bulgaria and the Antarctic
Ellsworth Mountains
Mountains of Ellsworth Land